= VfB Nürnberg =

German football club

VfB 1911 Nürnberg
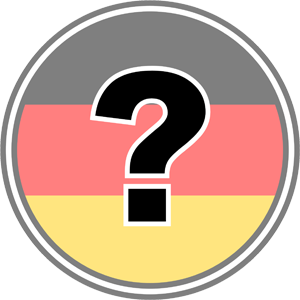
- Full name: Verein für Bewegungsspiele 1911 Nürnberg e.V.
- Founded: 1911
Home colours	Away colours

VfB Nürnberg was a German association football club from Nuremberg, Bavaria. The club was established through the 1911 merger of FC Noris Nürnberg, FC Franken Nürnberg and FC Vorwärts Nürnberg.

The most successful of these predecessor sides was Noris Nürnberg which was an offshoot of the football department of gymnastics club MTV Nürnberg. This club had already played in the Ostkreisliga (en:Eastern District League) for several years. Immediately after the merger, VfB was relegated, but bounced right back the next season. In 1913, FC Concordia Nürnberg, founded in 1904, also joined the club. The Nuremberg team stayed in the top division until 1920, before disappearing into the lower divisions. In 1962, VfB Nürnberg merged with FC Langwasser to form present day side VfL Nürnberg.
